Bromley Green is a hamlet near Ashford in Kent, England.

Hamlets in Kent